Hamdi Dhouibi (born 24 January 1982 in Kairouan) is a Tunisian decathlete.

He held the African record with 8023 points, achieved at the 2005 World Championships in Helsinki. The record was broken by Larbi Bouraada of Algeria at the 2009 World Championships. Dhouibi also holds the African record in heptathlon (indoor) with 5733 points, achieved in March 2003 in Aubière.

International competitions

Personal bests
100 metres – 10.74 (Radés 2002)
400 metres – 47.04 (Helsinki 2005)
1500 metres – 4:21.15 (Almería 2005)
110 metres hurdles – 14.12 (Tunis 2003)
High jump – 1.99 m (Almería 2005)
Pole vault – 5.00 m (Wien 2002)
Long jump – 7.49 m (Gent 2002)
Shot put – 13.91 m (Desenzano del Garda 2003)
Discus throw – 43.96 m (Radés 2002)
Javelin throw – 55.12 m (Radés 2002)
Decathlon – 8023 pts (Helsinki 2005)

References

External links

1982 births
Living people
People from Kairouan
Tunisian decathletes
Tunisian male pole vaulters
African Games gold medalists for Tunisia
African Games medalists in athletics (track and field)
Mediterranean Games silver medalists for Tunisia
Mediterranean Games bronze medalists for Tunisia
Mediterranean Games medalists in athletics
Athletes (track and field) at the 2007 All-Africa Games
Athletes (track and field) at the 2001 Mediterranean Games
Athletes (track and field) at the 2005 Mediterranean Games
20th-century Tunisian people
21st-century Tunisian people